= Sewaniya Onkar =

- village
- Location within Madhya Pradesh Location within India
- Coordinates: 23.3003076°N 77.4766504°E
- Country: India
- State: Madhya Pradesh
- District: Bhopal
- Tehsil: Huzur
- Elevation: 498 m (1,634 ft)

Population (2011)
  - Total: 1,886
- Time zone: UTC+5:30 (IST)
- ISO 3166 code: MP-IN
- 2011 census code: 482452

Sewaniya Onkar is a village in the Bhopal district of Madhya Pradesh, India. It is located in the Huzur tehsil and the Phanda block.

== Demographics ==
According to the 2011 census of India, Sewaniya Onkar has 421 households. The effective literacy rate (i.e. the literacy rate of population excluding children aged 6 and below) is 61.25%.

Demographics (2011 Census)
| | Total | Male | Female |
|---|---|---|---|
| Population | 1886 | 956 | 930 |
| Children aged below 6 years | 348 | 171 | 177 |
| Scheduled caste | 388 | 192 | 196 |
| Scheduled tribe | 82 | 37 | 45 |
| Literates | 942 | 567 | 375 |
| Workers (all) | 970 | 488 | 482 |
| Main workers (total) | 905 | 469 | 436 |
| Main workers: Cultivators | 90 | 80 | 10 |
| Main workers: Agricultural labourers | 564 | 161 | 403 |
| Main workers: Household industry workers | 38 | 31 | 7 |
| Main workers: Other | 213 | 197 | 16 |
| Marginal workers (total) | 65 | 19 | 46 |
| Marginal workers: Cultivators | 10 | 2 | 8 |
| Marginal workers: Agricultural labourers | 42 | 7 | 35 |
| Marginal workers: Household industry workers | 0 | 0 | 0 |
| Marginal workers: Others | 13 | 10 | 3 |
| Non-workers | 916 | 468 | 448 |
